Portrait of Philippe-Laurent de Joubert is an oil-on-canvas painting by the French artist Jacques-Louis David. Its date is unknown, but Antoine Schnapper argues that it was between 1790 and 1792, since the subject died on 30 March 1792. It was left incomplete like his portraits of Madame Trudaine and Madame Pastoret. It is now in the Musée Fabre in Montpellier.

Bibliography 
 Luc de Nanteuil, David, Paris, Cercle d'Art, coll. « les grands peintres », 1987
 Antoine Schnapper (ed.) and Arlette Sérullaz, Jacques-Louis David 1748-1825 : catalogue de l'exposition rétrospective Louvre-Versailles 1989-1990, Paris, Réunion des Musées nationaux, 1989

Joubert
1790s paintings
Paintings in the collection of the Musée Fabre
Unfinished paintings